March of Millions, also titled Die Flucht (The Escape), is a German television war drama film. The film stars Maria Furtwängler in the role of Lena Gräfin von Mahlenberg, the leader of a small convoy of refugees from East Prussia (including French and Russian prisoners of war and forced labourers) fleeing the advancing Red Army in the winter of 1944–1945, and trying to survive uprooted in Bavaria in the aftermath of World War II. When first broadcast by ARD in two parts, on 4 and 5 March 2007, it drew 13.5 million viewers.

The production was reported to have cost €9m and to have employed over 2,000 extras.

The film was controversial for portraying German war-time suffering during the evacuation of East Prussia (although a number of German atrocities were also shown or mentioned), and led to adverse comments from Marek Cichocki, the foreign policy advisor to Polish President Lech Kaczyński at the time, fearful of potential German claims to lands or property in East Prussia lost after the World War II. There have been multiple reactions from the Polish side on occasion of other films about the war.

Awards
 2007 Bambi award as "TV Event of the Year"
 2007 Bavarian TV Award to Holly Fink (cinematographer)
 2007 Romy award to Nico Hofmann (producer)
 2007 Deutscher Fernsehpreis to Knut Loewe and Wiebke Kratz for Best Design
 2007 Deutscher Fernsehpreis to Enjott Schneider for Best Music
 2007 Deutscher Fernsehpreis to Gabriela Maria Schmeide as Best Supporting Actress

Cast
Maria Furtwängler as Magdalena von Mahlenberg
Jürgen Hentsch as Berthold von Mahlenberg
Jean-Yves Berteloot as François Beauvais
Frédéric Vonhof as Louis
Tonio Arango as Heinrich von Gernstorff
Angela Winkler as Sophie von Gernstorff
Hanns Zischler as Rüdiger von Gernstorff
Max von Thun as Ferdinand von Gernstorff
Adrian Wahlen as Benno Stuber
Adrian Goessel as Wilhelm Stuber
Gabriela Maria Schmeide as Babette
Stella Kunkat as Viktoria von Mahlenberg
Fritz Karl as Gauleiter Herrmann
Winfried Glatzeder as Dietrich (servant)
Ralf Dittrich as Major Metzger

References

External links
 

2007 films
2007 television films
2000s German television series
German television films
2000s German-language films
German-language television shows
Eastern Front of World War II films
German World War II films
German war drama films
Das Erste original programming

Films set in 1945
Films set in Prussia
Films about nobility